HMCS Middlesex was a reciprocating engine-powered  built for the Royal Canadian Navy during the Second World War. Entering service in 1944, the vessel served as a convoy escort in the Battle of the Atlantic. Following the war, the ship ran aground on 2 December 1946 and broken up for scrap.

Design and description
The ships' complement consisted of 85 officers and ratings.

The reciprocating ships had two vertical triple-expansion steam engines, each driving one shaft, using steam provided by two Admiralty three-drum boilers.

The Algerine class was armed with a QF  Mk V anti-aircraft gun and four twin-gun mounts for Oerlikon 20 mm cannon. The latter guns were in short supply when the first ships were being completed and they often got a proportion of single mounts. By 1944, single-barrel Bofors 40 mm mounts began replacing the twin 20 mm mounts on a one for one basis. All of the ships were fitted for four throwers and two rails for depth charges. Many Canadian ships omitted their sweeping gear in exchange for a 24-barrel Hedgehog spigot mortar and a stowage capacity for 90+ depth charges.

Construction and career
Middlesex was laid down by Port Arthur Shipbuilding Co. Ltd. at Port Arthur, Ontario on 29 September 1942. The ship was launched on 27 May 1943 and commissioned into the Royal Canadian Navy at Port Arthur on 8 June 1944.

After commissioning, Middlesex sailed up the St. Lawrence River to Halifax, Nova Scotia. From there, the ship was sent to Bermuda to work up before returning to Halifax. Upon her return, the minesweeper was assigned to the Western Escort Force as a convoy escort in the Battle of the Atlantic. The ship deployed as part of escort group W-3, joining the group on 30 August 1944. In November 1944, Middlesex was made Senior Officer's Ship of the group. As Senior Officer Ship, the commander of the escort would be aboard her during convoy missions. She remained with the group as Senior Officer Ship until it was disbanded in June 1945.

Middlesex underwent a refit at Halifax before being placed in reserve there following the end of the war. In March 1946, the ship was reactivated as an emergency ship based out of Halifax. In April, Middlesex rescued 32 crew and passengers from the merchant vessel Alfios after the ship had run aground on Sable Island. While responding to an emergency call from the fishing vessel Ohio in December, Middlesex ran aground on Half Island Point near Halifax. The crew escaped unharmed and a naval tug was sent to assist the ship, while another ship was sent to assist Ohio. However, the ship was unable to be pulled off the rocks and declared a constructive total loss on 12 December 1946. The ship was officially put up for sale in March 1947.

See also
 List of ships of the Canadian Navy

References

Bibliography

External links 
 Haze Gray and Underway
 ReadyAyeReady.com

 

Algerine-class minesweepers of the Royal Canadian Navy
Ships built in Ontario
1943 ships
World War II minesweepers of Canada
World War II escort ships of Canada
Maritime incidents in 1946